Somali Americans are Americans of Somali ancestry. The first ethnic Somalis to arrive in the U.S. were sailors who came in the 1920s from British Somaliland. They were followed by students pursuing higher studies in the 1960s and 1970s, by the late 1970s through the late 1980s and early 1990s more Somalis arrived. However, it was not until the mid and late 1990s when the civil war in Somalia broke out that the majority of Somalis arrived in the United States. The Somali community in the U.S is now among the largest in the Somali diaspora.

History

The earliest ethnic Somali immigrants to the United States were sailors who arrived in the 1920s, mainly from British Somaliland. Eventually acquiring American citizenship, they actively participated in the Somali independence movement and served as key liaisons whenever Somali political figures visited the UN headquarters. For their substantial contributions to Somali society, these early Somali expatriates were rewarded with medals by the Somali government and some were also issued land back home. Following independence in 1960, Somali students began arriving in the US to pursue higher studies while living with relatives or on scholarships. Many of the youngsters returned to Somalia after graduation and went on to play an important role in the development of their nation. During the 1980s, a small number of Somalis settled in the United States. They were later joined by many other ethnic Somalis from different backgrounds, who sought asylum in the US after the outbreak of the civil war in Somalia or emigrated from other parts of Greater Somalia.

A large number of the Somali immigrants settled in Minnesota, which by 2002 harbored the largest population of Somalis in North America. Many of the newer arrivals came through voluntary agencies (VOLAGS) contracted with the State Department, who helped them settle in. By 2006, Somalis in the state accounted for $164–$394 million in purchasing power and owned 600 businesses. The city of Minneapolis in particular hosts hundreds of Somali-owned and operated commercial ventures. As of the 2015 American Community Survey, there are 57,000 residents in the state who are of Somali ancestry, among whom 31,400 were born in Somalia.

Somalis in the United States often send resources to their extended families abroad, remittances that were facilitated by the signing of the Money Remittances Improvement Act. Following a greatly improved security situation in Somalia in 2012, many Somali U.S. residents have also begun returning to Mogadishu and other parts of the country. A few of the homeward-bound immigrants along with some American-born associates have been sought and/or prosecuted for allegedly providing material support to the Al-Shabaab and Islamic State political militant groups. However, according to intelligence officials, fewer expatriates were joining the groups' ranks by late 2013. Most of the returnees have instead repatriated for investment opportunities and to take part in the ongoing post-conflict reconstruction process in Somalia. Participating in the renovation of schools, hospitals, roads and other infrastructure, they have played a leading role in the capital's recovery and have also helped propel the local real estate market.

Demographics

Current estimates of the number of Somali immigrants living in the United States vary widely, ranging from 35,760 to 150,000 persons. 2010 American Community Survey data indicates that there are approximately 85,700 people with Somali ancestry in the US. Of those, around 25,000 or one third live in Minnesota; 21,000 of the latter were born in Somalia. Nationwide, 76,205 were Somalia-born. Somalis are the second largest ethnic group from the Horn of Africa, after Ethiopians.

According to US Census Bureau estimates for 2008-2012, the largest concentration of Somalia-born people in the United States is in the Minneapolis-St. Paul-Bloomington area (17,320) of Minnesota. Other metropolitan areas with significant numbers of Somali Americans include Columbus, Ohio (8,280), Seattle-Tacoma-Bellevue in Washington (7,850), San Diego-Carlsbad-San Marcos in California (2,845), Washington, D.C.-Arlington-Alexandria in the Virginia-D.C. area (2,715), Atlanta-Sandy Springs-Marietta in Georgia (2,305), Phoenix-Mesa-Glendale in Arizona (1,965), Portland-Vancouver-Hillsboro in Oregon (1,480), Nashville-Davidson-Murfreesboro-Franklin in Tennessee (1,420), Boston-Cambridge-Quincy in Massachusetts (1,380), and other areas (28,650).

In 2014, the Minneapolis City Council passed a resolution marking July 1 as Somali American Day. The event commemorates the Independence Day of Somalia, which is annually celebrated on the same day. The council also approved a resolution making Minneapolis and Bosaso in northeastern Somalia sister cities. Additionally, the Federal Government of Somalia announced that it would start officially keeping count of Somalis abroad.

Employment
Many Somali refugees in the US have experienced difficulties accessing the labour market. According to the 2010 census, 47% of Somalis in Minnesota were employed, 13% unemployed and 40% were economically inactive. By comparison, the unemployment amongst the state's overall foreign-born population was 6%. The unemployment rate of Somalis in Minnesota is, however, significantly lower than amongst Somali populations in places including London and Toronto. At the national level, survey data over the period 2011 to 2015 shows that 58% of working Somali Americans were employed and 5.1% self-employed, compared to 26% and 0.7% of working-age Somalis in Sweden.

Community organizations

The Somali community in the United States is represented by various Somali-run organizations. Somali Community Services in San Jose and the Somali American Council of Oregon (SACOO) on the west coast offer guidance to new Somali families and works closely with the municipal authorities to strengthen civic relations. The Somali Community Access Network (SomaliCAN) is one of several groups serving Columbus' Somali community. In Minnesota, the Confederation of Somali Community in Minnesota (CSCM), Somali American Parent Association (SAPA), and Somali Action Alliance also offer various social services to the state's resident Somalis.

Politically, a Somali American Caucus in the Minnesota Democratic–Farmer–Labor Party (DFL) was formed to represent the Somali community. A Somali American also chairs the Republican Party's Immigrant Relations Committee in Minnesota.

Diplomatic missions
Somalis in the United States are represented by the embassy of Somalia in Washington, D.C. The embassies of Djibouti and Ethiopia in the capital provide additional diplomatic representation for resident ethnic Somalis. The self-declared republic of Somaliland maintains a representative office in Washington as well.

Notable people

Barkhad Abdi, actor, Academy Award nominee
Mohamed Abdullahi Mohamed, diplomat, professor and politician; President of Somalia
Ilhan Omar, congresswoman, first Somali American elected to US House of Representatives
Dahir Adan Elmi  Chief Commander of Somali National Army 2000s
Mohammad Ali Samatar Former Somali Prime Minister 1987–1990
Ali Khalif Galaydh  Somali Politician and Former Minister 1980s
Abdiweli Mohamed Ali, An Economist,  Former Somali Prime Minister

See also

Somali diaspora
Dalmar TV, a Somali-language television network
History of the Somalis in Minneapolis–Saint Paul
Somalia–United States relations

References

External links
Somali American media

Horn Africans in the United States
 
American
 
 
Political refugees in the United States
African-American society